Codiac Transpo is the urban transit service of the City of Moncton, operated on behalf of Moncton, the City of Dieppe and the Town of Riverview in New Brunswick, Canada. The transit system provides express and local bus service for the residents of the Greater Moncton area and charter service throughout the southeastern area of the province. Maritime-wide bus service is provided by Maritime Bus.

Services

Codiac Transit offers free wireless Internet on all its buses. Initially, four buses on the Express route were equipped with onboard broadband Internet and marked with lime green Wi-Fi signage. Wi-fi access was later expanded to the entire fleet. Codiac Transpo also operates a real-time bus location tracking system, allowing customers to determine bus wait times.

Routes
Codiac Transpo currently operates 19 regular routes Monday to Saturday, some of which provide additional evening and Sunday service:
 50 Red Line (Plaza Boulevard to CF Champlain Mall via Wheeler Blvd.)
 51 Green Line (Mountain Road service, from Plaza Boulevard to Avenir Centre) 
 52 Blue Line (Main Street service, from Avenir Centre to CF Champlain Mall) 
 60 Bessborough
 61 Elmwood
 62 Hildegard
 63 Lewisville
 64 Hospitals
 65 Killam
 66 Caledonia
 67 Edinburgh
 68 Salisbury
 70 Frampton
 71 Coliseum
 72 Université
 80 Gunningsville
 81 Riverview
 82 Riverview Place
 93 Champlain
 94 Centrale
 95 Amirault

2012 lockout
Codiac Transpo service was suspended on June 27, 2012, when the City of Moncton locked out members of ATU Local 1290. Codiac Transpo service resumed after a settlement with the union was reached on November 30, 2012.

References

External links
 
 Transit History of Moncton, New Brunswick
 Codiac Transit bus pictures

Transit agencies in New Brunswick
Transport in Moncton
Transport in Riverview, New Brunswick
Transport in Dieppe, New Brunswick
Transport in Greater Moncton
Crown corporations of New Brunswick
Companies based in Moncton
Bus transport in New Brunswick